Friends in Love is a studio album by the American singer Dionne Warwick. It was released by Arista Records on April 14, 1982, in the United States. Her third album for the label, it was recorded during the winter of 1981-82, with production by Jay Graydon. It peaked at number 87 on the US Billboard 200. Singles from the album include the title track, a duet with singer Johnny Mathis, which made the Top 40 on the US Billboard Hot 100 and follow-up  "For You," which peaked at number 14 on the adult contemporary chart.

Track listing
All tracks produced by Jay Graydon.

Personnel and credits 
Musicians

 Dionne Warwick – lead vocals
 David Foster – Rhodes (1, 4, 7), acoustic piano (2, 4, 7, 10), string arrangements (2, 4), synthesizers (7)
 Steve Porcaro – Rhodes (1), synthesizers (1, 7)
 Jay Graydon – rhythm arrangements, synthesizers (1, 6, 7), guitar (1-4, 6, 7, 8, 10), percussion (3)
 Robbie Buchanan – acoustic piano (3, 6), Rhodes (3, 5), synthesizers (5, 6), synthesizer arrangements (5)
 Michael Boddicker – synthesizers (5, 8, 9)
 Michael Omartian – synthesizers (8, 10), acoustic piano (9), string arrangements (9, 10)
 Stevie Wonder – acoustic piano (8)
 Dean Parks – acoustic guitar (3)
 Steve Lukather – guitar (4)
 Larry Carlton – acoustic guitar (5)
 Marty Walsh – electric guitar (5)
 Michael Landau – guitar (9)
 Abraham Laboriel – bass (1, 4, 7, 10)
 Mike Porcaro – bass (2, 3, 5, 8, 9)
 Steve Gadd – drums (1, 4)
 Mike Baird – drums (2, 3, 5-8, 10)
 Jeff Porcaro – drums (9)
 Victor Feldman – percussion (2, 10)
 Charles Loper – trombone 
 Chuck Findley – trumpet 
 Gary Grant – trumpet
 Jerry Hey – trumpet, horn arrangements, flugelhorn (3, 7)
 Johnny Mandel – string arrangements (1)
 Jeremy Lubbock – string arrangements (2, 3, 4)
 Assa Drori – concertmaster (1-4, 9, 10)
 Steve George – backing vocals (1), synthesizers (6, 8), Rhodes (8)
 Richard Page – backing vocals (1-9)
 Johnny Mathis – lead vocals (2, 7)
 Bill Champlin – backing vocals (2-9)
 Venette Gloud – backing vocals (2-9)
 Carmen Twillie – backing vocals (6)

Production

 Producer – Jay Graydon
 Recorded and Mixed by Ian Eales and Jay Graydon at Garden Rake Studio (Sherman Oaks, CA).
 Strings recorded by Al Schmitt at Capitol Studios (Hollywood, CA).
 Art Direction and Design – Donn Davenport 
 Photography – David Vance
 Inner Sleeve Photography – John Pinderhughes

Charts

References

External links
Friends in Love at Discogs

1982 albums
Dionne Warwick albums
albums arranged by Johnny Mandel
Arista Records albums